Goodenia geniculata, commonly known as bent goodenia or native primrose, is a species of flowering plant in the family Goodeniaceae and is endemic to south-eastern Australia. It is a low-lying to ascending herb with linear to lance-shaped, often toothed leaves at the base of the plant and racemes of yellow flowers with hairy backs.

Description

Taxonomy and naming
Goodenia geniculata was first formally described in 1810 by Robert Brown in Prodromus Florae Novae Hollandiae et Insulae Van Diemen.

Distribution and habitat
This goodenia grows in woodland, forest, grassland and scrub from the Eyre Peninsula in South Australia to Victoria, where it is often common, and in a few locations in Tasmania, where it is rare.

Conservation status
In Tasmania, Goodenia geniculata is classified as "endangered" under the Tasmanian Government Threatened Species Protection Act 1995.

References

geniculata
Flora of South Australia
Flora of Victoria (Australia)
Flora of Tasmania
Plants described in 1810
Taxa named by Robert Brown (botanist, born 1773)